Leionema hillebrandii, commonly known as Mount Lofty phebalium, is a perennial, woody shrub endemic to South Australia. It has variable shaped leaves and pinkish flowers from late winter to spring.

Description
The leaves may be squared with a point or rounded at the apex or acute with two lobes, rounded with a shallow notch, papery, smooth texture or rough with short hard protrusions on the upper surface. The stamens are more or less equal in length to the petals and the anthers pink. Flowering occurs from August to October.

Taxonomy and naming
Mount Lofty phebalium was described in 1957 as Phebalium hillebrandii by J.H Willis, but the name was changed to Leionema hillebrandii in 1998 by Paul G. Wilson and the description was published in the journal Nuytsia. The specific epithet (hillebrandii) was named in honour of Dr. Wilhelm Hillebrand a friend of Baron von Mueller.

Distribution and habitat
This species is found along rocky waterways from Mount Lofty to Tanunda in South Australia.

References

hillebrandii
Sapindales of Australia
Flora of South Australia